Disney Channel is a Spanish terrestrial television channel owned and operated by The Walt Disney Company Iberia (Disney Spain & Portugal).

It was launched on 17 April 1998 as a pay television channel, aimed for children to teenagers. On 2001, Disney launched a timeshift channel 'Disney Channel +1', broadcasts the same programming one hour late. And on 1 July 2008, it was launched and replaced Fly Music on Spanish digital terrestrial television, thus becoming the first Disney Channel that broadcasts pay TV-free, a practice that would be replicated in other markets in the following years.

An HD feed of the channel is available but it is exclusive to pay TV operators, while on DTT it only broadcasts at a standard definition of 576i.

History
Disney Channel Spain was launched in 1998, when The Walt Disney Company and Sogecable (now Prisa TV) make an agreement to distribute a Spanish version of the American Disney Channel on the satellite platform Canal Satélite Digital. The channel began broadcasting on April 17, 1998. The channel carried local-made shows and Disney's animation library. A Spanish version of the British show Art Attack, hosted by Jordi Cruz, was also produced and broadcast, among others.

In September 1999, Disney Channel Spain adopted Disney Channel UK's "Circles" logo and ident set created by GÉDÉON. 3 years later, Disney started to offer three more channels: a timeshift channel, called Disney Channel +1, Toon Disney and Playhouse Disney. Toon Disney's schedule was meant to air exclusively Disney animation, while Playhouse was a channel for a preschool audience.

In February 2008, the Walt Disney Company Iberia (TWDCI) decided to buy 20% stake in digital terrestrial television multiplex operator Sociedad Gestora de Televisión Net TV. After the purchase, Net TV was owned by Vocento (55%), Intereconomía Group (25%) and TWDCI (20%). Finally, the company announced in late May 2008 the launch of Disney Channel replacing Net TV's Fly Music as a digital over-the-air channel on July 1, 2008. In the same day, Toon Disney became Disney Cinemagic, like the British and French versions did two years before.

On May 1, 2010, Disney Channel Spain started broadcasting in 16:9 widescreen. Disney Channel has launched its new App logo on June 20, 2011. The website was also revamped. In 2012 a service called Disney Replay was introduced. It airs full episodes of series. The Phineas and Ferb episode "Knot My Problem" first premiered on this service on June 10, 2013. In November 2013 the site was changed again as per the other European Disney Channels.

Disney Channel+1 was gradually discontinued over the course of the 2010s, being mostly replaced with Disney Channel HD. The channel was permanently discontinued on March 9, 2017, after being removed from Vodafone TV, in favor of rewind features built into the Cable Boxes.

By the end of 2014, Disney Cinemagic closed its doors in Spain. Eventually a spiritual successor would be launched in the form of Movistar Disney, a channel exclusive to the pay-TV operator Movistar Plus. The channel was launched on December 22, 2017, and closed by the end of March 2020, due to the launch of Disney+ in Spain, alongside Disney XD.

By December 23, 2021, it was announced that Disney had sold its 20% on Net TV to Squirrel Media, who acquired Vocento's 55% a few weeks prior. This has led to speculation about Disney Channel in Spain potentially closing, or at least leaving terrestrial television in Spain, just like what has happened with other versions of the channel worldwide since the launch of Disney+, despite the channel continuing to broadcast on Spanish DTT.

Logos

See also 
 Disney Channel
 Disney Junior

References

External links
 Official Website
 Disney Channel TDT

Spain
Channel
Television stations in Spain
Television channels and stations established in 1998
Spanish-language television stations
1998 establishments in Spain
Television in Andorra
Television stations in Equatorial Guinea